American actress and singer Scarlett Johansson has released two studio albums, four extended plays (EPs), and four singles (including one as a featured artist). Her debut studio album, Anywhere I Lay My Head, was released on May 20, 2008. Reviews of the album were mixed, or average. Spin commented, "There's nothing particularly compelling about Scarlett Johansson's singing." Conversely, some critics found it to be "surprisingly alluring", "a bravely eccentric selection", and "a brilliant album" with "ghostly magic". Released on September 8, 2009, she and singer Pete Yorn recorded a collaborative album, Break Up, inspired by Serge Gainsbourg's duets with Brigitte Bardot.

Studio albums

Extended plays

Singles

As lead artist

As featured artist

Promotional singles

With band "The Singles"

Guest appearances

Music videos
As lead artist

Guest appearances

As director

Notes

References

Discography
Discographies of American artists
Alternative rock discographies